Sorkheh Deh-e Sofla (also Romanized as Sorkheh Deh-e Soflá) is a village in Koregah-e Sharqi Rural District, in the Central District of Khorramabad County, Lorestan Province, Iran. At the 2006 census, its population was 1,095, in 188 families.

References 

Towns and villages in Khorramabad County